A Types is the third full-length album released by the post-hardcore band Hopesfall. The musical direction of this album deviated vastly from their hardcore roots, instead opting for a more rock-oriented sound.

On January 28, 2017, the album was released on vinyl through Equal Vision Records.

Track listing

Charts

Personnel
Jay Forrest – lead vocals
Joshua Brigham – guitar
Dustin Nadler – guitar
Mike Tyson – bass
Adam Baker – drums

References

Hopesfall albums
2004 albums
Trustkill Records albums
Equal Vision Records albums